The city of Jacksonville, Florida, has been home to many notable people, groups, and organizations.
Those listed may have been born or raised in Jacksonville, been influenced by the city while living, working or retiring there, or lived in the metropolitan area.

Civil rights leaders

Listed chronologically by year of birth:
Cataline Simmons (1806 - 1883)
 James Weldon Johnson (1871–1938), educator, lawyer, diplomat, songwriter, and civil rights activist; wrote The Autobiography of an Ex-Colored Man and the words to "Lift Every Voice and Sing"
 A. Philip Randolph (1889–1979), African-American civil rights activist

Political and government leaders

Listed chronologically by year of birth:
 Saturiwa (16th century), paramount chief of the Saturiwa chiefdom, comprising 30 Mocama Timucua villages in present-day Jacksonville
 Jean Ribault (1520–1565), French naval officer who led the first recorded expedition to the Jacksonville area
 René Goulaine de Laudonnière (c. 1529–1574), founder of Fort Caroline in modern Jacksonville, the first French settlement in North America
 Isaiah Hart (1792–1861), plantation owner and founder of Jacksonville
 Ossian B. Hart (1821–1874), 10th governor of Florida 1873–1874 and Florida Supreme Court Justice
 Francis P. Fleming (1841–1908), 15th governor of Florida 1889–1893
 Napoleon B. Broward (1857–1910), 19th governor of Florida 1905–1909; Jacksonville Sheriff 1888–1894
 Duncan U. Fletcher (1859–1936), two-term mayor of Jacksonville and U.S. Senator 1909–1936
 Claude L'Engle (1868–1919), United States Representative from Florida
 St. Elmo W. Acosta (1875–1947), city commissioner, state legislator and parks commissioner
 Ion Farris (1878–1934), former Speaker of the Florida House of Representatives and member of the Florida Senate
 John W. Martin (1884–1958), former Jacksonville mayor and 24th governor of Florida 1921–1925
 Emory H. Price (1899–1976), U.S. Representative from Florida
 Fuller Warren (1905–1973), 30th governor of Florida 1949–1953
 Charles Edward Bennett (1910–2003), U.S. representative from 2nd/3rd congressional district 1949–1993
 W. Haydon Burns (1912–1987), 35th governor of Florida 1965–1967; Jacksonville mayor 1949–1965
 Dorcas Drake (1916–1993), Duval County judge and philanthropist
 Jerry E. Hinshaw (1917–2003), Arkansas state representative from 1981 to 1996; worked for Ralston-Purina in Jacksonville after World War II
 Alan Stephenson Boyd (1922–2020), the first United States Secretary of Transportation
 Ed Austin (1926–2011), former mayor of Jacksonville
 Willye Dennis (1926–2012), Florida House of Representatives: 15th District 1992–2009
 Edward L. Howard (1926–2011), Pennsylvania State Senator: 10th District 1971–1986
 Claude R. Kirk, Jr. (1926–2011), 36th governor of Florida 1967–1971
 Lou Ritter (1926–2010), former mayor of Jacksonville
 Hans Tanzler (1927–2013), former mayor of Jacksonville
 Don Davis (1931–2008), former city council president, Florida legislator and civic leader
 Lou Frost (1931–2008), lawyer and public defender 1968–2005
 Maurice M. Paul (1932–2016), United States District Court for the Northern District of Florida Judge
 Don Fuqua (born 1933), U.S. representative from 9th/2nd congressional district 1963–1987
 Jake Godbold (1933–2020), former mayor of Jacksonville
 Frank F. Ledford, Jr. (1934–2019), former Surgeon General of the U.S. Army
 Bill Birchfield (1935–2016), state legislator 1970–1974, lawyer, civic leader
 Tom Slade, Jr. (1936–2014), legislator, lobbyist, businessman
 James E. King (1939–2009), State Representative 1986–1999; State Senator 1999–2009
 Harry Shorstein (born 1941), lawyer and State Attorney, 4th Judicial Circuit 1991–2008
 Tillie Fowler (1942–2005), U.S. representative: 4th congressional district 1993–2001; Jacksonville City Council: 1985–1992
 Nat Glover (born 1943), first African-American sheriff of Jacksonville, 1995–2003
 Ander Crenshaw (born 1944), State Representative 1972–1978; State Senator 1986–1994; U.S. Representative: 4th congressional district 2001–2017
 Mike Blouin (born 1945), U.S. Representative for Iowa's Second Congressional District
 Tommy Hazouri (1945–2021), former Jacksonville mayor and city council president
 Corrine Brown (born 1946), former U.S. representative
 John Rutherford (born 1952), Sheriff of Jacksonville 2004–2015, U.S. representative 2017-present
 Angela Corey (born 1954), lawyer and State Attorney, 4th Judicial Circuit 2009–2012
 John Delaney (born 1956), former mayor of Jacksonville and former president of the University of North Florida
 Randy Brinson (born 1957), gastroenterologist and Christian right activist
 Thom Tillis (born 1960), former Speaker of the North Carolina House of Representatives and U.S. Senator from North Carolina
 Alvin Brown (born 1961), first African-American mayor of Jacksonville 2011–2015
 John Peyton (born 1964), Jacksonville mayor 2004–2011
 Ron DeSantis (born 1978), former U.S. representative for Florida's 6th Congressional District, 46th governor of Florida

Business and civic leaders

Listed chronologically by year of birth:
 Zephaniah Kingsley (1765–1843), major slaveholder and owner of Kingsley Plantation
 Anna Kingsley (1793–1870), former slave, common-law wife of Kingsley, who became a businesswoman and slaveholder
 Martha Reed Mitchell (1818-1902), philanthropist and socialite
 Henry Morrison Flagler (1830–1913), tycoon, real estate promoter, railroad developer and partner in Standard Oil
 Alice A. W. Cadwallader (1832-1910), philanthropist and temperance activist
 Alexander Darnes (c.1840–1894), born into slavery, gained his medical degree and became first black doctor of Jacksonville
 Alfred I. duPont (1864–1935), industrialist, financier and philanthropist
 Abraham Lincoln Lewis (1865–1947), businessman and developer of American Beach, Florida
 Cora Crane (1865–1910), journalist, brothel owner known for her relationship with Stephen Crane, lived in the Jacksonville area multiple from 1894
 Arthur Pratt Warner (1870–1957), aviator
 Henry John Klutho (1873–1964), Prairie School architect who influenced redevelopment of Jacksonville following the Great Fire of 1901
 Victor Earl Mark (1876–1948), architect
 Eartha M. M. White (1876–1974), African-American philanthropist and humanitarian
 Maxey Dell Moody (1883–1949), founder of M. D. Moody & Sons, Inc.
 Jessie Ball duPont (1884–1970), teacher and philanthropist
 Charles E. Merrill (1885–1956), co-founder of Merrill, Lynch & Company
 Ed Ball (1888–1981), businessman who ran the Alfred I. duPont Testamentary Trust for 46 years
 H. Terry Parker (1890–1970), philanthropist; co-founder of Gulf Life Insurance Co., vice president of A.B. Farquhar Company
 Leslie R. Nicholas (1902–1948), The Guardian Life Insurance Company of America executive and Pacific War veteran
 Louis Wolfson (1912–2007), Wall Street financier, race horse owner-breeder and philanthropist
 Maxey Dell Moody, Jr. (1913–1987), businessman and founder of MOBRO Marine, Inc.
 Denham Fouts (1914–1949), prostitute, socialite and literary muse
 J. J. Daniel (1916–1990), lawyer, businessman and civic leader
 Claude Yates (1916–1988), business executive and "father of Jacksonville Consolidation"
 Taylor Hardwick (1925–2014), architect of Jacksonville schools, businesses and parks
 Herb Peyton (born 1926), businessman and civic leader
 Homer G. Lindsay, Jr. (1927–2000), influential preacher and former pastor of the nation's third largest Southern Baptist church
 Leslie Nicholas Jr. (1927–2007), Southern Bell executive
 Raymond K. Mason (born 1927), businessman and protégé of Ed Ball
 Frank Cerveny (born 1933), Episcopal bishop of Florida
 Lex Hester (1935–2000), key architect of Jacksonville's consolidated government
 Wayne Weaver (born 1935), shoe mogul and former owner of Jacksonville Jaguars from (1993 to 2011)
 MaVynee Betsch (1935–2005), Black activist and environmentalist for American Beach
 Jerry Vines (born 1937), president, Southern Baptist Convention, and former pastor of the nation's third-largest Southern Baptist church
 Preston Haskell (born 1938), founder and chairman, The Haskell Company; minority owner of Jacksonville Jaguars
 Tom Petway (born 1941), businessman, Jacksonville Jaguars minority partner, civic leader
 Theodore Roosevelt IV (born 1942), businessman and great-grandson of President Theodore Roosevelt
 Norman E. Thagard (born 1943), NASA astronaut
 Maxey Dell Moody III (born 1944), businessman
 Donald Moran (born 1945), chief judge of 4th judicial circuit
 Steve Pajcic (born 1946), lawyer, state representative, Florida Gubernatorial candidate and philanthropist
 Gary Pajcic (1947–2006), athlete, lawyer and philanthropist
 Elizabeth Edwards (1949–2010), attorney, law professor and wife of Senator John Edwards
 Shahid Khan (born 1950), entrepreneur and owner of the Jacksonville Jaguars
 Samuel Johnson Howard (born 1951), Episcopal bishop of Florida
 Carey Cavanaugh (born 1955), professor and former American ambassador/peace mediator
 John Palumbo (born 1958), motivational speaker, businessman and salesman
 John Michael Phillips (born 1975), attorney, motivational speaker and news commentator
 Diana Eng (born 1983), fashion designer and contestant on Season 2 of Project Runway
 Zoe Keffer (born 2006), first junior handler to win Best of Breed in Rottweilers at the Best of Breed at the Westminster Kennel Club Dog Show

Artists and designers

 Sanford Augustus Brookins (1877–1968), architect, builder, and businessperson; active in the neighborhoods of Sugar Hill, Durkee Gardens, and Riverside.
 David Johnson (born 1926), photographer of San Francisco's Fillmore District, first African American student of Ansel Adams
 Augusta Savage (1892–1962), sculptor associated with the Harlem Renaissance
 Mildred Thompson (1935–2003), painter, printmaker and sculptor

Writers

Listed chronologically by year of birth:
 Harriet Beecher Stowe (1811–1896), author and abolitionist, best known for Uncle Tom's Cabin
 Stephen Crane (1871–1900), author of The Red Badge of Courage, lived in Jacksonville for a few weeks in 1896 and 1897; the stay inspired "The Open Boat"
 Zora Neale Hurston (1891–1960), author and anthropologist, known for Their Eyes Were Watching God, lived in Jacksonville during several periods from 1904
 Pat Frank (1908–1964), journalist and novelist
 Stetson Kennedy (1916–2011), author, folklorist and human rights activist who infiltrated the Ku Klux Klan, exposing its secrets to authorities and the outside world
 Madeleine L'Engle (1918–2007), author of A Wrinkle in Time
 E. L. Konigsburg (1930–2013), Newbery-winning novelist
 Rebecca Heflin (born 1963), women's fiction and romance novelist
 Charles Martin (born 1969), New York Times-bestselling author
 Deesha Philyaw (born c. 1971), author of The Secret Lives of Church Ladies
 Dawnie Walton (born 1976), journalist and author of The Final Revival of Opal & Nev
 Greg Wrenn (born c. 1980), poet and nonfiction writer
 Dantiel Moniz (born c. 1990), author of Blood Milk Heat

Scientists and scholars

 Mazie O. Tyson (c. 1900–1975), geographer, college professor
 John Archibald Wheeler (1911–2008), theoretical physicist
 Philip Don Estridge (1937–1985), "Father of the IBM PC," led development of original IBM Personal Computer
 Michael Persinger (born 1945), neuroscientist, psychologist and noted philanthropist
 Susana Urbina (born 1946), psychologist, professor at the University of North Florida
 Charles T. Meide (born 1971), maritime archaeologist and Director of LAMP at the St. Augustine Lighthouse
 Kevin Folta (born 1967), professor of horticultural sciences at the University of North Florida

Athletes

Listed chronologically by year of birth:
 Bob Gandy (1893–1945), MLB outfielder for the Philadelphia Phillies
 Paul Schreiber (1902–1982), MLB pitcher and coach for the New York Yankees
 Coley Wallace (1927–2005), heavyweight boxer and actor
 Tom Scott (1930–2015), NFL linebacker for the Philadelphia Eagles and New York Giants
 Don Bessent (1931–1990), MLB pitcher for the Brooklyn/Los Angeles Dodgers
 John Chaney (1932–2021), Temple University basketball coach
 Dennis Viollet (1933–1999), Manchester United, Stoke City soccer player, Jacksonville University men's soccer coach
 Al Frazier (1935–2018), college all-American and Denver Broncos football player
 LeeRoy Yarbrough (1938–1984), NASCAR driver
 Al Denson (born 1942), NFL wide receiver for the Denver Broncos and Minnesota Vikings
 Bob Hayes (1942–2002), 1964 Olympic gold medalist (2) sprinter; Hall of Fame NFL wide receiver for Dallas Cowboys
 Joseph Dube (born 1944), Olympic medalist 1968 Summer Olympics and world champion 1969 World Weightlifting Championships
 Sam Davis (1944–2019), offensive guard for Pittsburgh Steelers
 Tug McGraw (1944–2004), pitcher for New York Mets, Jacksonville Suns and Philadelphia Phillies; father of Tim McGraw
 Ron Sellers (born 1947), NFL wide receiver for the New England Patriots, Dallas Cowboys and Miami Dolphins
 Ken Burrough (born 1948), NFL wide receiver for the Houston Oilers and New Orleans Saints
 Harold Carmichael (born 1949), NFL wide receiver with Philadelphia Eagles for 14 seasons
 Larry Brown (born 1949), NFL tight end
 Ray Nettles (1949–2009), Canadian Football League Hall of Fame linebacker
 Artis Gilmore (born 1949), Hall of Fame basketball player
 Boobie Clark (1949–1988), NFL fullback with Cincinnati Bengals for six seasons
 Ed Jenkins (born 1950), NFL wide receiver with four teams
 Jack Youngblood (born 1950), NFL Hall-of-Fame defensive end with the Los Angeles Rams
 Tom Sullivan (1950–2002), NFL running back with the Philadelphia Eagles and Cleveland Browns
 Noah Jackson (born 1951), NFL offensive lineman with the Chicago Bears and Tampa Bay Buccaneers
 Mark McCumber (born 1951), professional golfer
 Greg Coleman (born 1954), NFL punter for the Cleveland Browns, Minnesota Vikings and Washington Redskins
 Ron Meeks (born 1954), CFL player and NFL coach
 Derrick Gaffney (born 1955), NFL wide receiver for the New York Jets
 Fred Funk (born 1956), professional golfer
 Terry LeCount (born 1956), NFL wide receiver for the San Francisco 49ers and Minnesota Vikings
 Ron Duguay (born 1957), NHL player and ACHL and WHA coach
 Calvin Muhammad (born 1958), NFL wide receiver with the Los Angeles Raiders, Washington Redskins and San Diego Chargers
 Patty Moise (born 1960), NASCAR driver
 Vince Coleman (born 1961), MLB left fielder, St. Louis Cardinals
 Glenn Davis (born 1961), MLB first baseman for the Houston Astros and Baltimore Orioles
 "Merciless" Ray Mercer (born 1961), WBO World Heavyweight Champion 1991 and Olympic gold medalist
 Norris Coleman (born 1961), NBA forward for the Los Angeles Clippers, 1994 Israeli Basketball Premier League MVP
 Nancy Hogshead-Makar (born 1962), national and 1984 Olympic gold medalist swimmer
 Mike Oliphant (born 1963), NFL running back for the Washington Redskins and Cleveland Browns
 Vijay Singh (born 1963), professional golfer
 Bryan Barker (born 1964), punter for six NFL teams
 Otis Smith (born 1964), NBA player and GM Orlando Magic
 Willie Smith (born 1964), NFL player
 Joel Davis (born 1965), Major League Baseball pitcher for the Chicago White Sox
 Alvin Heggs (born 1967), NBA player with the Houston Rockets
 Rena Mero (born 1967), Rena Greek aka "Sable," WWE wrestler and actress
 Rick Wilkins (born 1967), MLB catcher with the Chicago Cubs
 Steve Lofton (born 1968), NFL cornerback with four teams
 Gary Alexander (born 1969), basketball player
 Dexter Jackson (born 1969), IFBB pro bodybuilder, 2008 Mr Olympia and nine-time Arnold Classic Champion
 Edgar Bennett (born 1969), Green Bay Packers running back
 Shawn Jefferson (born 1969), NFL wide receiver and coach
 Martin Lopez Zubero (born 1969), Olympic swimming gold medalist
 Dee Brown (born 1969), NBA player, Boston Celtics, Toronto Raptors, and Orlando Magic
 Jim Furyk (born 1970), professional golfer
 David Duval (born 1971), professional golfer
 Chipper Jones (born 1972), MLB third baseman, Atlanta Braves
 Nate Campbell (born 1972), professional boxer and lightweight title holder
 Derrick Alexander (born 1973), NFL defensive end for the Minnesota Vikings and Cleveland Browns
 Brian Dawkins (born 1973), Hall of Fame NFL safety, Philadelphia Eagles
 Chris Terry (born 1975), NFL center, Kansas City Chiefs
 Sam Cowart (born 1975), NFL linebacker for the Buffalo Bills, New York Jets and Minnesota Vikings
 Paul Rigdon (born 1975), MLB pitcher for the Cleveland Indians and Milwaukee Brewers
 Micah Ross (born 1975), NFL wide receiver for the Jacksonville Jaguars, San Diego Chargers and Carolina Panthers
 Rahim Abdullah (born 1976), NFL and CFL player
 Travis Tomko (born 1976), "TomKo," TNA professional wrestler
 Ryan Freel (1976–2012), MLB infielder and outfielder for the Cincinnati Reds
 Laveranues Coles (born 1977), NFL wide receiver for the New York Jets
 Rod Gardner (born 1977), NFL wide receiver for the Kansas City Chiefs
 Daniel Hollie (born 1977), WWE professional wrestler
 Lito Sheppard (born 1977), NFL cornerback for the Philadelphia Eagles
 Travis Chapman (born 1978), MLB third baseman for the Philadelphia Phillies
 Elijah Burke (born 1978), TNA professional wrestler
 Roosevelt Williams (born 1978), NFL cornerback for the Chicago Bears
 Travis Taylor (born 1978), wide receiver for six NFL teams
 Matt Lehr (born 1979), guard for six NFL teams
 Khalid Abdullah (born 1979), NFL and CFL linebacker
 Michael Jennings (born 1979), NFL wide receiver for the Indianapolis Colts
 Chris Barnwell (born 1979), MLB infielder for the Milwaukee Brewers
 Ryan Jorgensen (born 1979), MLB player for the Florida Marlins, Cincinnati Reds and Minnesota Twins
 Dez White (born 1979), NFL wide receiver for the Chicago Bears and Atlanta Falcons
 Jabar Gaffney (born 1980), NFL wide receiver for the New England Patriots
 Jonathan Papelbon (born 1980), MLB pitching closer for the Boston Red Sox, Philadelphia Phillies, Washington Nationals
 Rashean Mathis (born 1980), NFL cornerback for the Jacksonville Jaguars
 Brett Myers (born 1980), MLB relief pitcher for the Philadelphia Phillies
 Ben Nowland (born 1980), Arena Football League player
 Brian Buscher (born 1981), MLB third baseman for the Minnesota Twins
 Bubba Dickerson (born 1981), professional golfer
 Amer Delic (born 1982), professional tennis player
 Lionel Gates (born 1982), NFL running back for the Buffalo Bills and Tampa Bay Buccaneers
 Ciatrick Fason (born 1982), NFL running back for the Minnesota Vikings
 Darren O'Day (born 1982), MLB pitcher for the Atlanta Braves, Baltimore Orioles, Los Angeles Angels, New York Mets, Texas Rangers, and New York Yankees
 Guss Scott (born 1982), NFL safety for the New England Patriots and Houston Texans
 Leon Washington (born 1982), NFL running back for the New York Jets
 Brian Clark (born 1983), former NFL and CFL wide receiver
 Jamaal Fudge (born 1983), NFL safety for Jacksonville Jaguars
 Howie Kendrick (born 1983), MLB player for the Washington Nationals
 Stephen Nicholas (born 1983), NFL linebacker for the Atlanta Falcons
 Christian Gaddis (born 1984), NFL center for the Buffalo Bills, Cleveland Browns and Indianapolis Colts
 Reggie Lewis (born 1984), NFL and CFL cornerback
 Dee Webb (born 1984), NFL cornerback for the Jacksonville Jaguars
 Daniel Murphy (born 1985), MLB infielder for the Washington Nationals
 Bobby Cassevah (born 1985), MLB pitcher for the Los Angeles Angels
 Clarence Denmark (born 1985), NFL and CFL wide receiver
 Marcus Thomas (born 1985), NFL defensive tackle
 Billy Butler (born 1986), MLB DH for the Kansas City Royals
 Sha'reff Rashad (born 1986), NFL safety for the New York Giants
 Tony Carter (born 1986), NFL cornerback for the Denver Broncos
 Derwin Kitchen (born 1986), basketball player for Ironi Nahariya of the Israeli Basketball Premier League
 Josh Sitton (born 1986), NFL offensive guard for the Green Bay Packers
 Riley Skinner (born 1986), quarterback at Wake Forest University
 Tim Tebow (since age three; born 1987 in the Philippines), 2007 Heisman Trophy winner, Florida Gators, NFL quarterback, former professional baseball player
 Byron Hardmon (born 1981), former University of Florida football player, current defensive ends coach at Troy University
 Gerard Ross (born 1987), NFL player for the Seattle Seahawks
 Jaime Harper (born 1987), Clemson Tigers running back
 Kelly Kelly (born Barbara Jean Blank in 1987), actress, model, former WWE professional wrestler, former WWE Divas Champion
 Mike Clevinger (born 1990), MLB pitcher for the Chicago White Sox
John Brown (born 1992), basketball player
 Brian Ferlin (born 1992), NHL forward for the Boston Bruins
 Hayden Hurst (born 1993), former University of South Carolina player, NFL tight end, former professional baseball player
 Ryan Murphy (born 1995), Olympic swimming gold medalist
 Grayson Allen (born 1995), NBA guard for the Milwaukee Bucks
 Mac Jones (born 1998), former University of Alabama Quarterback, Heisman Trophy Runner-Up, NFL quarterback
 Nassir Little (born 2000), NBA player for the Portland Trail Blazers

Entertainers
Listed chronologically by year of birth:
Merian C. Cooper (1893–1973), Hollywood director, producer and writer, King Kong
Rosalie King-Simpson (1902–1997), stage actress and singer
Professor Backwards (1910-1976), comedian with 23 appearances on the Ed Sullivan Show
Ruth Hall (1910–2003), actress
William Tuttle (1912–2007), Hollywood makeup artist for over 300 movies and television shows
Frankie Manning (1914–2009), dancer and choreographer
Meinhardt Raabe (1915–2010), actor, played the Coroner Munchkin in The Wizard of Oz; resided at Penny Farms Retirement Community
Dorothy Shay (1921–1978), chanteuse, "The Park Avenue Hillbillie"
David Jack Holt (1927–2003), child actor, groomed to be the male Shirley Temple
Wanda Hendrix (1928–1981), actress, married World War II hero Audie Murphy
 Leonard Jackson (1928–2013), actor, starred on PBS shows Sesame Street and Shining Time Station
 Dave Madden (1931–2014), actor, known for starring in the 1970s sitcom The Partridge Family, in which he played the group's manager, Reuben Kincaid
Paula Kelly (1943–2020), dancer and actress best known for Sweet Charity and The Andromeda Strain
Gene Deckerhoff (born 1945), the voice of the Tampa Bay Buccaneers and Florida State Seminoles
Patrika Darbo (born 1948), television actress, Days of Our Lives
Ken Fallin (born 1948), caricaturist
Richard Chaves (born 1951), actor, known for playing "Poncho" in Predator
Henriette Allais (born 1954), model, Playboy Playmate March, 1980
Michael Emerson (born 1954), film, television, and stage actor
Rex Smith (born 1955), actor and singer, The Pirates of Penzance
Linden Ashby (born 1960), actor, known for playing Johnny Cage in Mortal Kombat and Sheriff Noah Stilinski in the MTV series Teen Wolf
Donna Deegan (born 1962), television news anchor
Leanza Cornett (1971–2020), 1993 Miss America, television actress
Al Letson (born 1974), radio host; host of National Public Radio's Reveal
Nichole Van Croft (1973–2018), model, Playboy Playmate October, 2000
Kat Candler (born 1974), film writer, producer, and director
Rahman Johnson (born 1976), radio personality, politician
Lil Duval (born 1977), comedian
Jennifer Rovero (born 1978), model, Playboy Playmate July, 1999
Emily Swallow (born 1979), film and television actor
Aaron Staton (born 1980), film and television actor
Daniel Breaker (born 1980), stage actor
Jessica Morris (born 1980), television actress, One Life to Live
Yoanna House (born 1980), fashion model, winner of cycle 2 of America's Next Top Model
Patrick Heusinger (born 1981), film, television, and stage actor
Tiffany Selby (born 1981), model, Playboy Playmate July, 2007
Whitney Thompson (born 1987), fashion model, winner of tenth cycle of America's Next Top Model
Ashley Greene (born 1987), actress, best known as Alice Cullen in Twilight
Ned Fulmer (born 1987), YouTuber, ex-host of The Try Guys
RJ Cyler (born 1995), actor

Musicians and composers
Listed chronologically by year of birth:
Frederick Delius (1862–1934), English composer, wrote Florida Suite; studied music in Jacksonville, lived nearby
John Rosamond Johnson (1873–1954), musical composer, brother of James Weldon
Arthur "Blind" Blake (1896–1934), influential blues guitarist
George Paxton (1914–1989), big band jazz leader, saxophonist, composer, producer
Billy Daniels (1915–1988), big band singer, actor
Samuel Jones (1924–1981), jazz bassist and cellist
Ray Charles (1930–2004), blind, soulful singer
Luther Dixon (1931–2009), record producer and songwriter
Jack Sheldon (1931–2019), bebop and West Coast jazz trumpeter, singer and actor
Pat Boone (born 1934), popular 1950s singer, actor and teen idol
Nick Todd (born 1935), pop singer
Jo Ann Campbell (born 1938), country and pop singer, actress
Scott McKenzie (1939–2012), rock and roll singer
Johnny Tillotson (born 1939), pop singer, songwriter, actor
Gary U.S. Bonds (born 1939), R&B singer
Alan Jabbour (1939–2017), old-time fiddler and folklorist
J.R. Cobb (1944–2019), guitarist and songwriter; member of Classics IV and Atlanta Rhythm Section
Jackie Moore (1946–2019), R&B singer
Claude "Butch" Trucks (1947–2017), drummer of Allman Brothers Band
Ronnie Van Zant (1948–1977), singer-songwriter, founder of Southern rock band Lynyrd Skynyrd
Rick Dees (born 1950), radio disc jockey, recorded novelty hit "Disco Duck"
Danny Joe Brown (1951–2005), songwriter and former singer for the band Molly Hatchet
Gary Rossington (1951-2023), guitarist, songwriter and founding member of Southern rock band Lynyrd Skynyrd
Allen Collins (1952–1990), guitarist, songwriter and founding member of Southern rock band Lynyrd Skynyrd
Donnie Van Zant (born 1952), lead singer of Southern rock band .38 Special
Johnny Van Zant (born 1959), lead vocalist for Lynyrd Skynyrd since reforming in 1987
Glenn Jones (born 1962), R&B and gospel singer
Marcus Roberts (born 1963), jazz pianist, composer, arranger, bandleader, and teacher
Vic Chesnutt (1964–2009), folk rock singer-songwriter
Fred Durst (born 1970), lead singer, founder of Nu metal band Limp Bizkit
James MacDonough (born 1970), former Iced Earth and Megadeth bass player
Greg Eklund (born 1970), drummer of Everclear
Scooter Ward (born 1970), singer, founder of post-grunge/alternative metal band Cold
Jeremy Marshall (born 1971), bassist for the band Cold
Terry Balsamo (born 1972), lead guitar for the band Evanescence
Rogue (born 1972), lead singer for the goth/electropop band The Crüxshadows
Kelly Hayes (born 1973), lead guitarist for the band Cold
Scott Borland (born 1977), former keyboard player for the band Limp Bizkit
Sam Rivers (born 1977), bass player for the band Limp Bizkit
Sam McCandless (born 1978), drummer for the band Cold
Ryan Key (born 1979), lead singer of the punk rock band Yellowcard
Derek Trucks (born 1979), child prodigy on guitar, member of Allman Brothers Band and Derek Trucks Band
Ben Cooper (born 1982), singer-songwriter, Electric President and Radical Face
Shannon Wright, singer-songwriter
Asia Cruise (born 1990), contemporary R&B singer
YK Osiris (born 1998), singer-songwriter
Nardo Wick (born 2001), rapper
SpotemGottem (born 2001), rapper

Bands
Listed chronologically by year the band was formed:
Classics IV (1965), pop rock
The Allman Brothers Band (1969), Southern rock
Lynyrd Skynyrd (1970), Southern rock
Blackfoot (1972), rock/Southern rock
Molly Hatchet (1975), Southern rock
.38 Special (1975), rock
69 Boyz (1993), hip hop
Limp Bizkit (1994), nu-metal
Inspection 12 (1994), pop punk
Quad City DJ's (1995), hip hop
Cold (1996), post-grunge
Yellowcard (1997), pop punk
Swirl 360 (1998), pop rock
Skyliner (2000), power metal
Burn Season (2001), hard rock
Evergreen Terrace (2001), melodic hardcore
Shinedown (2001), rock
Greyfield (2001), pop punk
Whole Wheat Bread (2003), punk rock
Casey Jones (2003), hardcore
Electric President (2003), indie/electronic
Radical Face (2003), experimental/folk/indie
The Red Jumpsuit Apparatus (2003), rock
Astronautalis (2003), hip hop
The Summer Obsession (2006), pop rock
Black Kids (2006), indie rock
Fit For Rivals (2008), rock
Tedeschi Trucks Band (2010), rock, blues rock, blues, soul
Breaking Through (2011), rock
The Black Pine (2014), indie/alternative rock

Serial killers
Listed chronologically by year of birth:
Henry Lee Lucas (1936–2001), serial killer
George Ronald York (1943–1965), executed spree killer
Paul John Knowles (1946–1974), serial killer nicknamed The Casanova Killer
Ottis Toole (1947–1996), serial killer and probable murderer of Adam Walsh
Paul Durousseau (born 1970), serial killer nicknamed the Killer Cabbie

References

Jacksonville, Florida
Jacksonville, Florida-related lists
Jacksonville